Bishop Jerome Dhas Varuvel, SDB, was born 21 October 1951 in Paduvoor in the diocese of Kottar.
He attended Carmel Secondary School in Nagercoil. From 1967 to 1968 he followed the pre-university course at the Scott Christian College, Nagercoil.  From 1968 to 1970 he attended the minor seminary at St. Aloysius Seminary in Nagercoil. He studied philosophy at Sacred Heart Seminary in Poonamallee (1970-1973). He also obtained a bachelor's degree in Economics from Arulanandar College, Karumathur, Madurai (1973-1976). In 1976 he decided to join the Salesians of Don Bosco. After completing the pre-novitiate (1976-1977) and novitiate (1977-1978), he made his religious profession temporary 24 May 1978. On 24 May 1981, he made his perpetual vows. From 1981 to 1986 he studied theology at the Salesians in Rome. He has a bachelor's degree in Economics and in Theology and a Licentiate in Pedagogy at the Pontifical Salesian University in Rome.

He was ordained priest by John Paul II on 2 June 1985. It belongs to the Salesian Province of Chennai, Tamil Nadu.

On 22 December 2014, Pope Francis appointed him the first bishop of the newly-erected diocese of Kuzhithurai, which was bifurcated from the diocese of Kottar. He was consecrated as bishop of the diocese of Kuzhithurai on 24 February 2015 at a ceremony presided by Peter Remigius, bishop of the diocese of Kottar. Co-consecrators were the Archbishop of Madurai, Antony Pappusamy, and the Archbishop of Madras-Mylapore, George Antonysamy.

Due to health reasons, Bishop Jerome Dhas Varuvel submitted his resignation to Pope Francis who accepted it on June 6, 2020 and appointed Archbishop Antony Pappusamy of Madurai as Apostolic Administrator of Kuzhithurai with immediate effect. 

After priestly ordination he held the following positions:
1985-1986: Completion of studies at the Pontifical Salesian University (Rome);
1986-1990: Vice-Rector of the Novitiate in Vellakinar;
1990-1992: Rector of the Pre-Novitiate in Tirupattur;
1992-1994: Rector of the Pre-Novitiate in Maiyam;
1994-1996: Dean of Student Salesian Trichy;
1996-2001: Pastor-Rector of the Con-Cathedral of Madras-Mylapore;
1999-2003: Provincial Councillor;
2001-2002: Director of Kalvi Solai (Center for education and culture), Tirupattur;
2002-2003: Director of Kalvi Solai (Center for education and culture), Ennore;
2003-2010: Director of Mount Don Bosco in Thalavadi, Erode;
2010-2014: Director of Novices at Yeallagiri Hills, Diocese of Vellore;
22 December 2014: Appointed as the first bishop of the diocese of Kuzhithurai;
24 February 2015: Consecration to the order of bishop.

References 

21st-century Roman Catholic bishops in India
1951 births
Living people
Salesian Pontifical University alumni
Salesian bishops